William Cobb was a pioneer of photography in Ipswich, Suffolk. He subsequently moved to Woolwich in southeast London where he continued to work.

Cobb had his premises in 1 Clarkson Street, Ipswich and also supported Richard Dykes Alexander, an amateur photographer who lived nearby.

After taking over the business of William Heathman, 77-78 Wellington Road, Woolwich in 1872, Cobb took photographs of members of the Royal Military Academy, Woolwich for use in Carte-de-visites. He used his photograph of Louis-Napoléon, Prince Imperial to promote his business.

He contributed several articles to the British Journal of Photography in 1880, including a paper he delivered to the South London Photographic Society (SLPS) on "Ballooning  from  a  Photographic  Point  of  View" in which he suggested that the SLPS obtain a balloon of its own.

References

19th-century English photographers
Photographers from Suffolk